Regina K. Scully is an American film producer and philanthropist. Scully is the founder of the Artemis Rising Foundation, an organization which produces documentary and narrative feature films focused on social justice issues. She has produced documentaries including Miss Representation (2011), The Invisible War (2012),  The Hunting Ground (2015) and Won't You Be My Neighbor? (2018). She has been nominated for two Primetime Emmy awards.

Career
Scully founded of RPR Marketing Communications, a marketing and publicity agency in New York City. Scully also founded Artemis Rising Foundation, an organization which produces narrative and documentary feature films focused on social justice issues. In 2011, Scully produced Miss Representation a documentary film directed by Jennifer Siebel Newsom, which follows how mainstream media's portrayal of women limits them from influential positions. As part of the film, Newsom launched The Representation Project, an organization which Scully serves as a board member.

In 2021, Scully served as an executive producer of What Would Sophia Loren Do? a film which follows her mother Nancy Kulik and her family and love for Sophia Loren, which was directed by Ross Kauffman for Netflix.

Scully has been nominated for two Primetime Emmy awards for serving as a producer on The Hunting Ground directed by Kirby Dick, and The Tale directed by Jennifer Fox''.

Scully won a News & Documentary Emmy Award for serving as an executive producer on I Am Evidence.

Filmography

Film

Television

References

External links
 

Living people
American documentary film producers
American philanthropists
Year of birth missing (living people)
21st-century American women
American women documentary filmmakers